The World Mental Health Survey Initiative is a collaborative project by World Health Organization, Harvard University, University of Michigan, and country-based researchers worldwide to coordinate the analysis and implementation of epidemiological surveys of mental and behavioral disorders and substance abuse in all WHO Regions.

Aim 
It is estimated that the burden of mental and addictive disorders are among the highest in the world with expected increase over the next decades. However, those estimations are not based on cross-sectional epidemiological surveys, rather, they are mainly based on literature reviews and isolated studies.
The WMH Survey Initiative aim is to accurately address the global burden of mental disorders by obtaining accurate cross-sectional information about the prevalences and correlates of mental and behavioral disorders as well as substance abuse, allowing for evaluation of risk factors and study of patterns of service use in order to target appropriate interventions.

Collaborators 
Collaborators in this survey come from all WHO regions of the world, with 27 participating countries.

References 

World Health Organization